2002 World Ice Hockey Championships may refer to:
 2002 Men's Ice Hockey World Championships
 2002 World Junior Ice Hockey Championships
 2002 IIHF World U18 Championships